Requiem Chevalier Vampire (French for Requiem Vampire Knight) is a Franco-British comic published by Nickel Editions. It was translated into English and published by the magazine Heavy Metal in the United States. It was also translated into German and published in Germany by Kult Editions as Requiem Der Vampirritter.

The story was written by Pat Mills (best known for his work on Sláine, Charley's War and ABC Warriors), and the illustrations were drawn by Olivier Ledroit (early volumes of the Black Moon Chronicles).

The comic was characterised by its extreme violence and each issue was more daring and darker than the previous one, sadomasochism was common in this comic and there were several scenes of violent sex. There was a lot of humour in this comic, although it was full of cynicism.  Because of the financial weaknesses of Nickel issues had to be released every 8 months at first, with Requiem's successes more time was given to the artists to work. Originally a total of 12 issues were expected, with issues released roughly a year apart; however, the series has been on hiatus since issue 11, published in November 2012.

In late June 2022 Mills announced that he had begun writing issues 12 and 13, which would be the final issues.

Publication history

To break into the French comic market was Pat Mills' dream – in order to do so, he established his own comics publishing company in France, as Nickel Editions, with his associates Jacques Collin and Olivier Ledroit. Jacques Collin had previously founded the company Zenda Editions. Mills and Ledroit had previously worked together on Sha.

Requiem Chevalier Vampire was Nickel's first editing job on comics and found comfortable success in France. Because Nickel Editions was founded for Requiem it was financially very fragile. Nickel did not even have a website for quite some time and employed no one but Mills, Ledroit, and Collin. Ledroit did all the blueprints himself with his wife. Roughly 30,000 copies of each issue were published, allowing Nickel not only to survive but to enlarge, getting its own offices and internet website. More artists were recruited by Nickel such as Adrian Smith and Franck Tacito.

Mills has explained some of the thinking behind the series:

Storyline 

The story is set in a world called Résurrection, which is often called Hell (however, it seems more like a mixture of Hell and Purgatory, as everyone seems to land in there – even "innocent victims" and the only known way to leave it is through purification or redemption, by being "expired" or "expiring" one's tormentor). In Résurrection people are re-incarnated into monsters according to the sins – or lack thereof – of their life. The lowest ranks are formed by zombies and Kobolds whilst vampires form the elite of the society and the ruling class. The more cruel one was in life, the better he is rewarded on Résurrection. There is therefore an inverted concept of justice in "Requiem Chevalier Vampire". Résurrection has a similar shape as Earth, but everything appears to be the opposite way around than on Earth. Land has replaced the oceans, while seas of perpetual fire occupy our known continents and time flows backwards. People do not get older but rejuvenate until they become a foetus and ultimately are forgotten; their memory follows the same cycle and is "lost" as people get younger. In order to avoid madness and total loss of their mind in this process, Résurrection's residents are addicted to a drug based on black opium. People do not land on Résurrection in the same order that they died (for instance, Requiem died before Otto and Claudia but landed on Résurrection after them).

The protagonist is a German soldier during World War II named Heinrich Augsburg, who is killed on the Eastern Front facing the Soviet Army. He is sent to Résurrection after his death and is attacked by a mob of zombies. During the confrontation he meets a vampire who calls himself Otto von Todt and befriends him. Otto reveals he is a vampire and explains that now Heinrich has become a vampire as well. As the story progresses, Heinrich (now known as Requiem) discovers the world of Résurrection, its peoples and politics. He is however only interested in retrieving a woman he loved during his lifetime and who he knows by the name of Rebecca.

Races and factions 

 Vampires: the ruling class of Résurrection. They were the most cruel men and women during their lifetime. Examples of vampires Requiem comes to meet are: Nero, Attila the Hun, Maximilien Robespierre (who is clearly depicted as if he were beheading a victim with his bare teeth, instead of just biting them), Aleister Crowley (named Black Sabbat), Caligula and Rasputin. There are even more dangerous vampires, who are forced into an eternal coma by the others because of the danger they represent, such is the case of Adolf Hitler.
 Ghouls: they were humans who could potentially have done as much harm as the vampires did on Earth, however ghouls were convinced they were acting for the greater good, while Vampires knew they were committing horrible crimes – and revelled in it. They became robbers and pirates on Résurrection and are in regular conflict with the vampires. Many of them are former nuns. They do not live in a particular state but in a flying city called Aerophagia. Some of them, however (such as Mère Terreur), were perfectly well aware that they were doing evil, yet used their position to manipulate their subordinates. Those "evil-aware" ghouls usually occupy higher leading positions in the ghouls fleet.
 Lémures are innocent victims who were the human victims that vampires, werewolves, centaurs and other evil-doers tortured or killed during their lifetime. The only way they have to flee Résurrection (without "re-dying") is to "expire" (kill) the tormentor responsible for their presence on Résurrection. They are types of ghosts that haunt vampires and torment what remains of their soul. To fight the vampires they took control of other species present like werewolves and centaurs. Some lemures (especially their leaders, such as Rebecca and Sean) do not seem to have too strong a ghostly appearance.
 Werewolves are the dead members of the inquisition (and possibly other fanatical religious factions as well – though the satanists Lady Claudia Demona, Sir Mortis and Baron Samedi were resurrected as vampires, not werewolves). They look like human priests but they can become oversized werewolves. They are one of the very few species that can prove as strong as vampires do. Despite their huge powers they are mere scavengers and the lemures found a way to control them. Werewolves at first seem to only be able to transform via Rebecca's remote control, but it is revealed that at least the strongest werewolves can either transform at will or if they are being threatened. This is revealed when Sean asks other lémures if they would settle for a public whipping of Torquemada, instead of killing him immediately before their desperate attack against Dracula's Knights. Lémures refuse, as they say Torquemada would just transform into their most powerful werewolf (but they do accept to postpone his execution).
 The Archaeologists are the only faction on Résurrection officially allowed to control human technology (though Lémures and, later, Vampires, control Werewolves with a remote control). They were scientists who designed disastrous weapons during their lifetime. They look like mummies and need to wear some other creature's skin to leave their sarcophagus. In order to do so they often flay members of other races alive and wear their skins as clothes. Of course, blood is not wasted, as it is the currency in Resurrection.
 Zombies form the majority of Résurrection's population. They are common people who did little harm around them and form the lowest rank of societies. Vampires feed on them and archaeologist often wear their skins.
 Berserkers : Even vampires are ordered by Dracula to leave a battlefield in a hurry, if berserkers are deployed. As their name suggests, berserkers only live to destroy any living form they come across (though it is unknown if they are prone to fight each other). As Nero states, berserkers only abide to one rule : "Si ça a un pouls, DEFONCE-LUI LE CRANE !" ("If it has a pulse, CRUSH ITS SKULL !"). Berserkers look like giant samurai armours (even bigger than the incredibly over-sized werewolves) who wield two blades simultaneously. Despite their samurai appearance, they fight in a "perfectly unsophisticated" manner and the only way to end the armageddon they cause is to detonate their dynamite collars. Before they are deployed on a battlefield, berserkers are kept in coffins. Their past sins are unknown.
 Centaurs : Former rapists. They seem to be natural enemies of harpies and werewolves (unless the werewolves that attack them may very well be simple pawns of lémures who use them to take revenge on centaurs).
 Harpies : Former infanticides. They make their nest out of living trees and must constantly watch out for centaurs.
 Living trees : People who inflicted self-harm and self-mutilation or committed suicide. Now, harpies "mutilate" them by using their branches to make their nest.
 Living mountains : Doomed poets who are doomed to cry and lament for all of eternity.
 Demons and Dragons : Physical embodiment of negative emotions. Some demons are capable of possession (as is seen in a parody of "The Exorcist", in volume 4 : "Le Bal Des Vampires"). Most demons are even capable of surviving the empalor (a feat only Torquemada has proven able to pull so far) and must be beheaded. Some dragons (if not all) have a very valuable stone in their body (usually located in the skull). At least one dragon has very poor eyesight. Some dragons (such as the Golgoths) have explosive excrement.
 Kobolds : In "Requiem Chevalier Vampire", Igor seems to be the only representative of his race (whatever that is). Though almost all creatures of Resurrection are dead, only Igor has a very repulsive stench. They are considered even lower than Zombies in Resurrectons hierarchy. In the spin-off, "Claudia Chevalier Vampire", other Kobolds make a very brief appearance, as well.
 Le Dictionnaire Du Diable : The Devil's Dictionary is a small pterodactyl/dragon hybrid that has knowledge of all the evil anyone has done in the universe. Other such birds are mentioned and said to help the police.
 Masters of the Infinite : Gods to which vampires pray. They appear to possess the ability to telepathically control the vampires, as Requiem initially observes that the Masters appear physically repugnant and immediately afterwards proclaims their infernal beauty.
 Mutants : They come from London's future and, since their appearance was already "monstruous", they were not transformed when entering Resurrection. Amongst many others, they include leopard-women and Anthrax (a mixture of all known diseases who looks like a skinless version of King Kong with metal body parts).
 Dystopians : A reptilian race apparently drawn from those who committed evil in the name of imperial colonization, they resemble the English during the Golden age. Their Queen Perfidia resembles Elizabeth I.  The Dystopians stole Dracula's shipment of Black Opium and ransomed it back to him. Dracula paid the ransom with gold he stole from the Dystopians when Attila sacked their capital city Donlon (an obvious clue that the Dystopians are based on the English, as Donlon is an anagram of London) based while the Dystopians were distracted by a jousting tournament between their knights and Dracula's knights. At the end of chapter 7 Queen Perfidia declares war on Dracula. Of all of Resurrection's creatures, Dystopians seem to be the most hypocrite, as they are willing to show contempt for the Vampires because of their perversion and their drug abuse - yet they are more than happy to sell the drugs to them (and even suggest the buy slaves from them as well).  In "Blood Bath", the Dystopians awaken their legendary King Ruhtra (Arthur spelled backward), who is a Lion-like Dragon.  Other members of the Arthurian legends are also represented such as Nilrem (Merlin) as a dino-egg and Tolecnal (Lancelot) as a dim-witted dragon-knight.
 Angels or Seraphims, priests heads, relicarie : The purity and goodness they embody is "the equivalent of anti-materia on Resurrection" – but it is no match for Nero's desacralisation powers. They are kept in missiles and bombs.
 Desacralised saints : Nero inflicted to them "Every imaginable vice – and some unimaginable vices. Let's just say they've been neroed". The perversion and impurity they have been tainted with can neutralise holy weapons with ease.

Characters

Vampires 
 Requiem is the main character of the comics. He was a Nazi soldier fighting on the eastern front and was killed by a Soviet soldier. After two years training he became a vampire knight on Résurrection. However, he cannot forget his destructive relationship with Rebecca, a Jewish woman he loved. Requiem becomes involved in a major plot against Dracula (yet, he finds it incredibly difficult to choose his side in this conflict).
 Dracula is the only one on Résurrection who also was a vampire in his previous incarnation on earth. Originally a Prince of Wallachia known as Vlad the Impaler, he survived his death by becoming a vampire. Because of his unique status, after his destruction on earth he became the vampire's leader on Résurrection as a superior being: immortal (immunised to time), more powerful and especially more evil than the other vampires. He does not rejuvenate like the other characters and can grant others this gift. Dracula's appearance could be compared to a vampiric archangel of evil : while extraordinary tall, he has a great pair of black wings, his fangs are far bigger than the usual vampire and he usually dresses in a dark red chaos armor. Only by his appearance and his looks, Dracula is already and drastically inspiring terror to all around him. Always acting like an incarnation of evil in its purest form, his incredible obsession with impalement is commented in a form of gallows humour, when his ship (The Satanik) is introduced by Otto to Requiem. Incidentally, one of the most powerful weapons in the series is called the impaler (and makes a "Tepess" onomatopaeic sound).
 Elisabeth Bathory (spelled Bathori) : Dracula's bride. Has a sexual relationship with Lady Claudia Demona. Does not rejuvenate, as she was granted her husband's gift. However, her regenaration powers are limitless. She is also a very skilled blood sorceress.
 Otto was a Nazi soldier whose faith in the Reich was flawless, he survived World War II and fled to South America. There he was found by nazi hunters and killed by Rebecca's twin sister. As a vampire of Hell he is the one who finds the newly arrived Requiem and introduces him to the laws of Résurrection. He is found to be responsible for Rebecca's death and only desires to torment her even more in Résurrection.
 Lady Claudia Demonia : She is a major character who is developed in her own line of comics. On earth she was the guardian of a gate to Hell and performed human sacrifices. One of the sacrifices failed and the victim could escape the ritual, so Claudia was personally punished by the forces of Hell and died of spontaneous combustion after the missed sacrifice. She became one of the most wicked creatures on Résurrection, spending much of her time in sadomasochist sexual rituals. She is the one who killed Sean, her "lover". Unlike other vampires who either flee or fight or mind-control (by drinking their blood) their personal lémures to avoid their persecution, Lady Claudia Demona actually loves to be reminded of the torment she has inflicted her victims, during her lifetime. Thus, lémures do not haunt her dreams anymore (to her great dismay). It is thus unknown if she really needs the black opium to forget her past. On Earth, she made a deal with dark forces: she was to sacrifice her own daughter, Carly, on her twenty-first birthday, in exchange for Vampire Knight training in Resurrection.
 Thurim was a teutonic knight who died during the Battle of the Ice against orthodox Russians. As a teutonic knight Thurim deviated from his original religious fanaticism and used faith as a pretext for his personal interest (he was secretly a satanist). He fought with the holy hammer Thurim he stole from the Ark of the Covenant (which was revealed to be the hammer Lucifer used before his fall from heaven). By striking the ice with his hammer he broke the frozen lake and died drowning in the frozen waters. In hell he became one of the most powerful vampire and dared to oppose Dracula himself. Dracula punished him to eternal suffering but Thurim escaped the sentence by planning his own reincarnation.
 Black Sabbath: The reincarnation of Aleister Crowley is the chairman of the infernal bank. He sets the interest rates on blood or innocent victims and control the inflation. He is directly commanded by Dracula, he is however a major character of the plot aiming to overthrow Dracula.
 Aiwass is a most curious character. Presented as a dark goddess, she prefers to use the physical appearance of a mandrill. She was a priestess in the ancient Egyptian world, where she knew Aleister Crowley in one of his previous incarnation. In Hell she is the voice of "the queen of the dead souls", the goddess of war and vengeance. She is the head of the plot against Dracula. Aiwass is not her real name and her true identity and physical appearance are only revealed later in the series.

Others
 Sean was living with Claudia on earth. At first, he did not know of Claudia's duty as guardian of the gate to hell. When he discovered Claudia's dual identity he tried to stop her but she killed him. He became a Lémure on Résurrection and wants to avenge himself from Claudia.
 Rebecca was Requiem's romantic love on earth. After his death Requiem idealised Rebecca. Their relationship was however far from simple. Requiem strongly believed in an absolutely blind form of patriotism that made him only see the suffering of his mother land and the sabotage of deportation trains – entirely failing to see tho other side of the world, that was all the suffering Nazis caused – and Rebecca was Jewish. Their relationship eventually became more violent and turned into a love-hate relation. However, upon his resurrection as a vampire, Requiem seems to be harvesting a kind of conscience, a sense of justice, guilt and a code of honour. She was killed by Otto who was in turn killed by Rebecca's sister. In the newest story Rebecca sees Heinrich with another vampire, Aiwass, and says, "so it's all over."
 Tomás de Torquemada is the most powerful werewolf of Résurrection. Notorious leader of the Spanish Inquisition he is first under Lemurian control but is then captured by the vampires and used by them.
 Archi-Hierophante is the supreme head of the archeologists. He masters advanced weapons and is a fearsome ruler. His identity on earth remains unknown but he was a specialist of human vivisection.
 Mitra is the obese matriarch of the ghouls. She was a corrupted police officer in her life. As a ghoul her only goal is to remove the vampires from power and establish ghouls as the new ruling class. It is later revealed she (or he) was the former head of the FBI, J. Edgar Hoover. In the series, he was a cross-dresser and paid Al Capone's men to protect him, while he was fighting Vampires that managed to escape Resurrection, in order to prepare Earth for "Dracula's second coming". She is killed by Bathori in volume 11
 Mother Terror was a nun leading the "sisters of the eternal silence". She 'ran homes for the sick like prisons', believing that pain and suffering brought people closer to God, while hypocritically providing herself with the best of medical care and embezzling public funding. As a ghoul she leads the pirate fleet. She commands the Queen Anne's Revenge she took after expiring the vampire Blackbeard. She was the former owner of Le Dictionnaire Du Diable (until Requiem unwillingly inherited it from her). Pat Mills has revealed that her identity on earth was Mother Teresa.
 Venus replaces Mother Terror at the head of the ghouls' fleet. She was the most notorious feminist of the Venus colony in the XXIIIrd century, advocating systematic sterilization of all males for the greater good and only speaking in politically correct terms (such as replacing the word "girlfriend" by the expression "non paid sexually exploited woman").
 Other real people are mentioned, such as Chapman (who was thought to have murdered Lenin, while it is Lennon he killed, as is reminded by a minion) or the historical doctor who inspired Mary Shelley to write "Frankenstein" (which means that we can expect at least one Frankenstein-like creature to populate Resurrection in a near future). Dracula also uses technology to keep the severed heads of master tacticians "alive" (or rather, livingly undead) and benefit from their wisdom (among those master tacticians are Julius Caesar, Napoleon Bonaparte, Saladin and Alexandre The Great – they appear to have become ghouls).
 Le Pèlerin : A powerful witch-hunter and obsessive puritan who has found a way to travel between time and space and even between Earth and Resurrection. Claudia actively seeks his televisa to return to Earth and sacrifice Carly. So far, he has only appeared in "Claudia Chevalier Vampire", but it could be speculated that the technology behind the televisa he stole is what allowed Vampires from Resurrection to invade Earth and kill Edgar Hoover. To this day, he is the only known living being in Resurrection.

Publications

French-language edition

The French-language volumes are all published by Nickel Editions:

Box of Volume 1–3   (January 13, 2005):
 "Résurrection" (48 pages, November 2000)
 "Danse macabre" (47 pages, September 2001)
 "Dracula" (48 pages, May 2002)
Box of Volume 4–6 (December 17, 2006)
 "Le Bal des vampires" (45 pages, November 2003)
 "Dragon Blitz" (47 pages, November 2004)
 "Hellfire Club" (47 pages, November 2005)
 "Le Couvent des Sœurs de Sang" (49 pages, February 2007)
 "La Reine des âmes mortes" (46 pages, November 2008)
 "La Cité des pirates" (50 pages, November 2009)
 "Bain de sang" (2011)
 "Amours défuntes" (2012)

English-language translations

The series is being translated into English and published in Heavy Metal.

 "Resurrection" (Volume 27 number 1, March 2003)
 "Danse Macabre" (Volume 28 number 1, March 2004)
 "Dracula" (Volume 28 number 6, January 2005)
 "The Vampire Ball" (Volume 30 number 2, May, 2006)
 "Dragon Blitz" (Volume 31 number 2, May, 2007)
 "Hellfire Club" (Vol. 32 No. 2, May 2008)
 "Requiem" (Vol. 33 No. 3, May 2009)
 "Requiem" (Vol. 34 No. 1, March 2010)
 "Pirate City" (Vol. 35, No. 1, March 2011)
 "Blood Bath" (Vol. 36, No. 1, March 2012)
 "Amores Defuntes" Heavy Metal Magazine failed to publish this volume in 2013 for unknown reasons.

They are collecting these stories in trade paperbacks (three to each volume):

Requiem:
 Resurrection (144 pages, May 2009)
 Volume 2 (144 pages, January 2010)

Panini Comics are also collecting the stories into trade paperbacks (two to each volume):

 Tome 1: Resurrection & Danse Macabre (112 pages, September 2009)
 Tome 2: Dracula & The Vampires Ball (112 pages, September 2009)
 Tome 3: Dragon Blitz & Hellfire Club (112 pages, November 2010)
 Tome 4: The Convent of the Sisters of Blood & The Queen of Dead Souls (112 pages, November 2010)
 Tome 5: The City of Pirates & Blood Bath (112 pages, November 2011)
 Tome 6: Deceased Loves (100 pages, announced for October 2017 but not released)

Dutch-language translations

The series is being translated into Dutch and the volumes are published by Prestige in the series "Requiem, de vampierridder"

 "Verrijzenis" (Number 1, 2003)
 "Dans met de dood" (Number 2, 2003)
 "Dracula" (Number 3, 2003)
 "Bal der vampiers" (Number 4, 2004)
 "Dragon Blitz" (Number 5, 2005)
 "Hellfire Club" (Number 6, 2006)
 "Het klooster der Bloedzusters" (Number 7, 2008)
 "De koningin der dode zielen" (Number 8, 2010)
 "De stad der piraten" (Number 9, 2011)
 "Bloedbad"(Number 10, 2012)
 "Oude liefde" (Number 11, 2013)

Claudia Chevalier Vampire 

Claudia Chevalier Vampire is a separate story featuring Lady Claudia. It takes place in the same world as "Requiem Chevalier Vampire" and adds new characters to the story. Pat Mills writes the story while illustrations are drawn by Franck Tacito. It is translated in German and published in Germany by Kult Editions as Claudia Der Vampirritter. This series is also translated in Dutch and published in the Netherlands by Prestige as Claudia de vampierridder.

Publications 

 "La Porte des Enfers" (46 pages, December 2004)  {Heavy Metal 2006 Halloween Issue}
 "Femmes violentes" (46 pages, December 2006)     {Heavy Metal 2009 (Fall) Terror Special}
 "Opium rouge" (48 pages, November 2007)      {Heavy Metal 2010 (Fall) Fright Special}
 "La Marque de la Bête"
 “La nuit du loup-garou”

Awards
2007: Won the "Favourite European Comics" Eagle Award

Notes

References

 Requiem Chevalier Vampire at Bedetheque

External links 
  
Resurrection: The Evils Nest

Reviews
 Oh My Gore review of volumes 1-4

Comics by Pat Mills
2000 comics debuts
2012 comics endings
French graphic novels
Horror comics
Cultural depictions of Tomás de Torquemada
Cultural depictions of Elizabeth Báthory
Cultural depictions of Maximilien Robespierre
Cultural depictions of Adolf Hitler
Cultural depictions of Grigori Rasputin
Cultural depictions of Caligula
Cultural depictions of Nero
Cultural depictions of Aleister Crowley
Fiction about purgatory